Alajos Ferenc Kenyery (later Kronberg, 13 May 1894 – 9 November 1955) was a Hungarian freestyle swimmer who competed in the 1912 Summer Olympics.

In 1912 he was eliminated in the first round of the 100 metre freestyle event. In the 400 metre freestyle competition he qualified for the semi-finals but he did not start in his heat. He was also a member of the Hungarian relay team which didn't show up at the final of the 4x200 metre freestyle relay event.

See also
World record progression 400 metres freestyle

References

External links
profile

1894 births
1955 deaths
Hungarian male swimmers
Hungarian male freestyle swimmers
Olympic swimmers of Hungary
Swimmers at the 1912 Summer Olympics
World record setters in swimming
Swimmers from Budapest